The Order of the Red Eagle was an order of chivalry of the Kingdom of Prussia. It was awarded to both military personnel and civilians, to recognize valor in combat, excellence in military leadership, long and faithful service to the kingdom, or other achievements. As with most German (and most other European) orders, the Order of the Red Eagle could only be awarded to commissioned officers or civilians of approximately equivalent status. However, there was a medal of the order, which could be awarded to non-commissioned officers and enlisted men, lower ranking civil servants and other civilians.

History
The predecessor to the Order of the Red Eagle was founded on 17 November 1705, by the Margrave Georg Wilhelm of Brandenburg-Bayreuth as the Ordre de la Sincerité. This soon fell into disuse but was revived in 1712 in Brandenburg-Bayreuth and again in 1734 in Brandenburg-Ansbach, where it first received the name of "Order of the Brandenburg Red Eagle". The statutes were changed in 1777 and the order named therein as the "Order of the Red Eagle". The order was conferred in one class, limited to fifty knights.

The Kingdom of Prussia absorbed both Brandenburg-Bayreuth and Brandenburg-Ansbach in January 1792, and on 12 June 1792, King Frederick William II again revived the order as a Prussian royal order. After the Order of the Black Eagle, the Order of the Red Eagle was the second highest order of the kingdom in order of precedence. Every Knight of the Black Eagle now automatically became a member of the contemporary highest class of the Order of the Red Eagle.

In 1810, King Frederick William III revised the statutes of the order, expanding it into three classes. In 1830, a breast star was authorized for the Second Class and the First Class General Honor Decoration became the Fourth Class of the order. The statutes were further revised in 1861, and a Grand Cross was established as the highest class of the order. By change to the statutes of the Order of the Black Eagle, every member of that order was automatically invested with the new Grand Cross of the Order of the Red Eagle, as well as with the Order of the Prussian Crown. By 1918, an affiliated soldier's medal had been made available to commoners and enlisted men.

Following the Kaiser's abdication at the close of the First World War, a new German constitution was signed into law on 11 August 1919, effectively putting a legal end to the monarchy. All orders and decorations formally conferred by the monarchy ceased to exist, but recipients of the Order of the Red Eagle continued to wear it with their other decorations during the eras of the Weimar Republic, the Third Reich, and the restored republic.

Classes
By the time of World War I, the order had evolved into four classes, two of them divided in two divisions each, and an affiliated medal:
 1st Class
 Grand Cross – enameled Maltese cross badge worn on a collar (the Kette, or "chain") at ceremonial occasions or, at other formal occasions, on a sash on the right shoulder; plus a gilt, eight-pointed breast star worn on the left chest; typically awarded to male members of the royal family, to members of the Order of the Black Eagle, to noblemen, and to foreign royalty
 1st Class – oversized, enameled cross pattée badge worn on a sash on the right shoulder, plus a silver, eight-pointed breast star on the left chest; available to general officers, high nobility, and heads of foreign state
 2nd Class – enameled cross pattée badge worn on a neck ribbon, plus a silver, four-pointed breast star on the left chest; available to general officers and nobility
 2nd Class with star
 2nd Class
 3rd Class – enameled cross pattée badge worn on a ribbon on the left chest; available to (usually no lower than) field grade officers and minor nobility
 4th Class – non-enameled cross pattée badge worn on a ribbon on the left chest; available to company grade officers
 Medal – round gilt medal worn on a ribbon on the left chest; available to enlisted men

Within these seven grades, however, were a bewildering array of variations. Among these were:
 All classes but the Medal of the Red Eagle Order could be awarded with swords for distinction in wartime. The swords passed through the arms of the cross behind the center medallion.
 All classes above the 4th Class could be awarded with "Swords on Ring", indicating that the recipient of that class without swords had earlier received a lower class of the order with swords. A pair of crossed swords were worn above the cross on the suspension ring or above the medallion on the upper arm of the breast star.
 All classes could be awarded with or without crown as an added distinction.
 The Grand Cross, 1st and 2nd Class could be awarded with oak leaves, indicating prior receipt of the next lower class of the order, and/or with diamonds, as a special distinction.
 Royal family members (who were automatically awarded the Grand Cross of the Red Eagle Order, per statute of the Order of the Black Eagle) were awarded the Grand Cross "with crown." The Maltese cross badge was suspended from a miniature of the Prussian crown, which covered the usual suspension ring.
 The Grand Cross was awarded at least once with crossed marshals' batons, as was awarded to Paul von Hindenburg. The crossed batons were worn above the Maltese cross badge of the Grand Cross, on its suspension ring.
 The 3rd Class could be awarded with bow (Schleife), indicating prior receipt of the 4th Class.
 Knights of Saint John who received the Order of the Red Eagle and who had cared for sick and wounded soldiers in the Second Schleswig War and the Austro-Prussian War received the order with a miniature of the Maltese cross.
 For 50 years of service, a Red Eagle recipient received the "Jubilee Number" (Jubiläumszahl), a round medallion with the number "50" on it, affixed to the suspension ring or to the oak leaves or the ring of the bow, if applicable.

There were also a set of special versions, the Stars 1st through 4th Class, for non-Christians.

Insignia

The badge of the order for the Grand Cross was a gold (gilt after 1916) Maltese cross enameled in white, with red enameled eagles between the arms of the cross; the gold central disc bore the Royal monogram, surrounded by a blue enameled ring bearing the motto of the Order, Sincere et Constanter.

The badge for the 1st to 3rd classes was a gold (gilt after 1916) cross pattée, enameled in white; that for the 4th class was similar but with smooth, plain silver arms. After 1879 the silver arms of the 4th class cross were pebbled in texture and appearance. The central disc bore the red eagle on a white enamel background on the obverse, with the royal cipher of King Friedrich Wilhelm surmounted by the Prussian crown on the reverse. The enlisted man's medal was of a relatively simple, round design, topped with the Prussian crown, with a depiction of the regular badge in the center of the medal on the obverse, with the royal cipher of the reigning monarch on the reverse.

The breast star of the order was (for the Grand Cross) a golden eight-pointed star, (for 1st Class) a silver eight-pointed star, or (for 2nd Class) a silver four-pointed star with a white enameled cross pattée, all with straight rays. The central disc bore the red eagle on a white enamel background, surrounded by a ring (enameled blue for Grand Cross, white for the others) bearing the motto of the Order, Sincere et Constanter.

After September 16, 1848, awards of all classes (except the medal) bestowed for military merit had two golden swords crossed through the central medallion.

The traditional ribbon of the order was white with two orange stripes at the edges, but combat awards were frequently conferred with a black and white ribbon similar to that of the Iron Cross. Numerous variations of the ribbon existed, depending on the nature of the specific award.

Sovereigns (1705–1918)

 George William, Margrave of Brandenburg-Bayreuth (11/16/1678 – 12/18/1726), Sovereign of the Ordre de la Sincerité, from November 17, 1705; and from 1712 to 12/18/1726.
 Karl Wilhelm Friedrich, Margrave of Brandenburg-Ansbach (5/12/1712 – 8/3/1757), revived the Order as its Sovereign, 1734 – August 3, 1757, renamed the order as the Order of the Red Eagle (Roter Adlerorden)
 Karl Alexander, Margrave of Brandenburg-Ansbach and Brandenburg-Bayreuth (2/24/1736 – 1/5/1806), Sovereign from August 3, 1757 to January 16, 1791, when the two territories were annexed by Prussia
 Friedrich Wilhelm II, King of Prussia (9/25/1744 – 11/16/1797), revived the Order as its first Sovereign as a Prussian order, June 12, 1792 – 11/16/1797
 Friedrich Wilhelm III, King of Prussia (8/3/1770 – 6/7/1840), Sovereign from 11/16/1797 – 6/7/1840; revised the statutes in 1810 to add 2nd and 3rd classes; added 2nd class breast star and a 4th class, 1830
 Friedrich Wilhelm IV, King of Prussia (10/15/1795 – 1/2/1861), Sovereign from 6/7/1840 to 1/2/1861
 Wilhelm I, King of Prussia and German Emperor (3/22/1797 – 3/9/1888), Sovereign from 1/2/1861 to 3/9/1888; revised the statutes to add the Grand Cross, 1861
 Friedrich III, King of Prussia and German Emperor (10/18/1831 – 6/15/1888), Sovereign from January to June 1888
 Wilhelm II, King of Prussia & German Emperor (1859–1941), invested 1/27/1869; Sovereign from June 15, 1888 to November 28, 1918.

Recipients

Grand Crosses
 Abbas II of Egypt
 Abdelaziz of Morocco
 Prince Adalbert of Prussia (1811–1873)
 Prince Adalbert of Prussia (1884–1948)
 Adolphus Frederick VI, Grand Duke of Mecklenburg-Strelitz
 Adolphus Frederick V, Grand Duke of Mecklenburg-Strelitz
 Albert I of Belgium
 Prince Albert of Prussia (1809–1872)
 Prince Albert of Saxe-Altenburg
 Prince Albert of Prussia (1837–1906)
 Albrecht, Duke of Württemberg
 Alexander Frederick, Landgrave of Hesse
 Prince Alexander of Hesse and by Rhine
 Prince Alexander of Prussia
 Alexis, Landgrave of Hesse-Philippsthal-Barchfeld
 Alfred, Duke of Saxe-Coburg and Gotha
 Alfred, Hereditary Prince of Saxe-Coburg and Gotha
 Alfred, 2nd Prince of Montenuovo
 Aoki Shūzō
 Prince Arisugawa Takehito
 Prince Arisugawa Taruhito
 Arthur Arz von Straußenburg
 Prince August Wilhelm of Prussia
 Augusta Victoria of Schleswig-Holstein
 Prince Axel of Denmark
 Barghash bin Said of Zanzibar
 Felix von Bendemann
 Prince Oscar Bernadotte
 Prince Bernhard of Saxe-Weimar-Eisenach (1792–1862)
 Hans Hartwig von Beseler
 Friedrich Ferdinand von Beust
 Otto von Bismarck
 Moritz von Bissing
 Leonhard Graf von Blumenthal
 Adolf von Bonin
 Julius von Bose
 Paul Bronsart von Schellendorff
 Walther Bronsart von Schellendorff
 Leo von Caprivi
 Prince Carl, Duke of Västergötland
 Charles XIV John
 Charles XV
 Charles Edward, Duke of Saxe-Coburg and Gotha
 Charles Egon III, Prince of Fürstenberg
 Prince Charles of Prussia
 Chlodwig, Prince of Hohenlohe-Schillingsfürst
 Chlodwig, Landgrave of Hesse-Philippsthal-Barchfeld
 Christian IX of Denmark
 Karl Ludwig d'Elsa
 Porfirio Díaz
 Otto von Diederichs
 Edward VII
 Prince Edward of Saxe-Weimar
 Hermann von Eichhorn
 Prince Eitel Friedrich of Prussia
 Otto von Emmich
 Prince Erik, Duke of Västmanland
 Ernest I, Duke of Saxe-Coburg and Gotha
 Ernest II, Duke of Saxe-Coburg and Gotha
 Ernest Augustus, Duke of Brunswick
 Ernest Louis, Grand Duke of Hesse
 Botho zu Eulenburg
 Max von Fabeck
 Maximilian Vogel von Falckenstein
 Ferdinand II of Portugal
 Hermann von François
 Eduard von Fransecky
 Franz Joseph I of Austria
 Frederick VIII of Denmark
 Frederick IX of Denmark
 Prince Frederick Charles of Hesse
 Frederick Francis II, Grand Duke of Mecklenburg-Schwerin
 Frederick Francis III, Grand Duke of Mecklenburg-Schwerin
 Frederick III, German Emperor
 Frederick, Prince of Hohenzollern
 Walthère Frère-Orban
 Prince Friedrich Karl of Prussia (1828–1885)
 Prince Friedrich Leopold of Prussia
 Prince Fushimi Hiroyasu
 Prince Fushimi Sadanaru
 Max von Gallwitz
 George II of Greece
 George V
 Friedrich von Gerok (officer)
 Godefroi, prince de La Tour d'Auvergne-Lauraguais
 Colmar Freiherr von der Goltz
 Heinrich von Gossler
 Guangxu Emperor
 Gustaf V
 Gustaf VI Adolf
 Prince Gustav of Denmark
 Haakon VII of Norway
 Gottlieb Graf von Haeseler
 Wilhelm von Hahnke
 Prince Harald of Denmark
 Max von Hausen
 Heinrich XXVII, Prince Reuss Younger Line
 Prince Heinrich of Hesse and by Rhine
 Prince Henry of Prussia (1862–1929)
 Prince Hermann of Saxe-Weimar-Eisenach (1825–1901)
 Karl Eberhard Herwarth von Bittenfeld
 J. B. van Heutsz
 Higashifushimi Yorihito
 Prince Konrad of Hohenlohe-Schillingsfürst
 Henning von Holtzendorff
 Dietrich von Hülsen-Haeseler
 Isma'il Pasha
 Prince Joachim of Prussia
 Prince Johann of Schleswig-Holstein-Sonderburg-Glücksburg
 Duke John Albert of Mecklenburg
 Prince Julius of Schleswig-Holstein-Sonderburg-Glücksburg
 Hans von Kaltenborn-Stachau
 Georg von Kameke
 Prince Kan'in Kotohito
 Prince Karl Anton of Hohenzollern
 Karl Anton, Prince of Hohenzollern
 Katsura Tarō
 Gustav von Kessel
 Mahboob Ali Khan
 Hans von Kirchbach
 Hugo von Kirchbach
 Prince Kitashirakawa Yoshihisa
 Eduard von Knorr
 Robert Koch
 Hans von Koester
 Prince Komatsu Akihito
 Leopold I of Belgium
 Leopold II of Belgium
 Prince Leopold, Duke of Albany
 Prince Leopold of Bavaria
 Rudolf von Leuthold
 Alexander von Linsingen
 Ewald von Lochow
 Walter von Loë
 Louis IV, Grand Duke of Hesse
 Louis XVIII
 Louis Ferdinand, Prince of Prussia
 Prince Louis of Battenberg
 Ludwig Wilhelm, Prince of Bentheim and Steinfurt
 Joseph Maximilian von Maillinger
 Albrecht Gustav von Manstein
 Edwin Freiherr von Manteuffel
 Manuel II of Portugal
 Joseph Freiherr von Maroicic
 Georg von der Marwitz
 Klemens von Metternich
 Grand Duke Michael Nikolaevich of Russia
 Helmuth von Moltke the Elder
 Helmuth von Moltke the Younger
 Rudolf Montecuccoli
 Prince Moritz of Saxe-Altenburg
 Georg Alexander von Müller
 Napoleon III
 Oscar II
 Prince Oskar of Prussia
 Alexander August Wilhelm von Pape
 Duke Paul Frederick of Mecklenburg
 Philipp, Prince of Eulenburg
 Prince Philippe, Count of Flanders
 Hans von Plessen
 Karl von Plettenberg
 Arthur von Posadowsky-Wehner
 Prince Friedrich Wilhelm of Prussia
 Naser al-Din Shah Qajar
 Georg Ræder
 Albrecht von Roon
 Prince Rudolf of Liechtenstein
 Reinhard Scheer
 Sigismund von Schlichting
 Alfred von Schlieffen
 Emil von Schlitz
 Kurd von Schlözer
 Gustav von Senden-Bibran
 Prince Sigismund of Prussia (1896–1978)
 Charles Spencer, 6th Earl Spencer
 Niklaus Friedrich von Steiger
 Karl Friedrich von Steinmetz
 Otto Graf zu Stolberg-Wernigerode
 Vladimir Sukhomlinov
 Ludwig Freiherr von und zu der Tann-Rathsamhausen
 Karl Tersztyánszky von Nádas
 Alfred von Tirpitz
 Prince Valdemar of Denmark
 Victor I, Duke of Ratibor
 Victor II, Duke of Ratibor
 Konstantin Bernhard von Voigts-Rhetz
 Prince Waldemar of Prussia (1889–1945)
 Alfred von Waldersee
 Arthur Wellesley, 1st Duke of Wellington
 August von Werder
 Wilhelm Karl, Duke of Urach
 Wilhelm, German Crown Prince
 Prince Wilhelm, Duke of Södermanland
 William I, German Emperor
 Duke William of Württemberg
 William, Prince of Hohenzollern
 William, Prince of Wied
 Friedrich Graf von Wrangel
 Duke Eugen of Württemberg (1846–1877)
 Yamagata Aritomo
 Yamamoto Gonnohyōe
 Heinrich von Zastrow
 Nikola Zhekov
1st Class
 Prince Adalbert of Bavaria (1828–1875)
 Albert, Prince Consort
 Alexander of Battenberg
 Alfred I, Prince of Windisch-Grätz
 August Gyldenstolpe
 Gustav Bachmann
 Alexander Barclay de Tolly-Weymarn
 Friedrich von Bernhardi
 Hans Alexis von Biehler
 Herbert von Bismarck
 Day Bosanquet
 Felix Graf von Bothmer
 Adalbert von Bredow
 Friedrich Wilhelm Freiherr von Bülow
 Heinrich von Bülow (diplomat)
 Eduard von Capelle
 Ernest Cassel
 Prince Christian Victor of Schleswig-Holstein
 Leopold Wilhelm von Dobschütz
 Ludvig Douglas
 Eduard, Duke of Anhalt
 Carl August Ehrensvärd (1858–1944)
 Ernst II, Duke of Saxe-Altenburg
 Archduke Franz Karl of Austria
 Archduke Friedrich, Duke of Teschen
 August Neidhardt von Gneisenau
 Hans von Gronau
 Gustav, Prince of Vasa
 Jakob von Hartmann
 Samu Hazai
 Frederick VI, Landgrave of Hesse-Homburg
 Friedrich von Ingenohl
 Archduke John of Austria
 Kalākaua
 Prince Karl Theodor of Bavaria
 Algernon Keith-Falconer, 9th Earl of Kintore
 Kodama Gentarō
 Konstantin of Hohenlohe-Schillingsfürst
 Leopold IV, Duke of Anhalt
 Charles Liedts
 Archduke Ludwig Viktor of Austria
 Duke Charles of Mecklenburg
 Christoph Johann von Medem
 Emmanuel von Mensdorff-Pouilly
 Ivan Nabokov
 August Ludwig von Nostitz
 Jean-Baptiste Nothomb
 Alexey Fyodorovich Orlov
 Prince Paul of Württemberg
 Ernst von Pfuel
 Georg Dubislav Ludwig von Pirch
 Ernst von Plener
 Hugo von Pohl
 Carlo Andrea Pozzo di Borgo
 Joseph Radetzky von Radetz
 Antoni Wilhelm Radziwiłł
 Wilhelm Eugen Ludwig Ferdinand von Rohr
 Willem Rooseboom
 Saionji Kinmochi
 Saitō Makoto
 Friedrich von Scholtz
 Ludwig von Schröder
 Archduke Stephen of Austria (Palatine of Hungary)
 Rudolf Stöger-Steiner von Steinstätten
 Hermann von Strantz
 Vladimir Sukhomlinov
 Julius von Verdy du Vernois
 Wilhelm René de l'Homme de Courbière
 William II, Elector of Hesse
 Prince William of Baden (1829–1897)
 Prince William of Hesse-Philippsthal-Barchfeld
 Ludwig von Wolzogen
 Duke Eugen of Württemberg (1788–1857)
 Arthur Zimmermann
2nd Class
 Akiyama Yoshifuru
 Ilya I. Alekseyev
 Duke Alexander of Württemberg (1771–1833)
 William Balck
 Martin Chales de Beaulieu
 Paul Behncke
 Konstantin von Benckendorff
 Wilhelm von Bismarck
 Friedrich Boedicker
 Paul von Bruns
 Hans von Bülow
 Christian Conrad Sophus Danneskiold-Samsøe (1836-1908)
 Evgraf Davydov
 Hermann Deiters
 Karl von Einem
 Ludwig Elster
 Oskar Enqvist
 Friedrich Albrecht zu Eulenburg
 Ivan Fullon
 Georg Freiherr von Gayl
 Sidney Greville
 Wilhelm Groener
 Erich von Gündell
 Ernst August Hagen
 Friedrich von Hassel
 Franz von Hipper
 Eberhard von Hofacker
 Oskar von Hutier
 Paisi Kaysarov
 August von Kleist
 Konstantin Poltoratsky
 Hermann von Kuhl
 Julius Kühn
 Alfred von Kühne
 Alexander Mikhailovich Lermontov
 Otto von Lossow
 Friedrich Graf von der Schulenburg
 Edward Montagu-Stuart-Wortley
 Curt von Morgen
 Otto von Moser
 Dmitry Neverovsky
 Georg Heinrich Ludwig Nicolovius
 Ferdinand von Quast
 Wilhelm von Ramming
 Hubert von Rebeur-Paschwitz
 Nikolai Reitsenshtein
 Ludwig von Reuter
 Eduard Schensnovich
 Heinrich Scheuch
 Ehrhard Schmidt
 Leopold von Schrötter
 Carl Georg Schwing
 Arkady Skugarevsky
 Wilhelm Souchon
 Adolf von Trotha
 Nikita Volkonsky
 Oskar von Watter
3rd Class
 Theobald von Bethmann Hollweg
 Nikolai Dimitrievich Dabić
 Gunther von Etzel
 Victor Franke
 Ivan Fullon
 Hasan bey Agalarov
 Ernst von Hoeppner
 Adolf Wild von Hohenborn
 Ferdinand Jühlke
 Karl Wilhelm Heinrich von Kleist
 Friedrich Wilhelm Kritzinger (theologian)
 Wilhelm Lamey
 Leberecht Maass
 Hugo Meurer
 Jan Willem Louis van Oordt
 Ferdinand von Parseval
 Johann Heinrich Richartz
 Manfred von Richthofen
 Alfred Saalwächter
 Eberhard Graf von Schmettow
 Constantin von Tischendorf
 Eduard Vogel von Falckenstein
 Ferdinand Franz Wallraf
Other or Unknown Classes
 Konrad Adenauer
 Yevgeni Ivanovich Alekseyev
 Ali bin Hamud of Zanzibar
 Marcos Antônio de Araújo, Viscount of Itajubá
 Augusta Victoria of Schleswig-Holstein
 Theodor Avellan
 Karl Gustav von Baggovut
 Pyotr Bagration
 Michael Andreas Barclay de Tolly
 Jacob Friedrich Behrend
 Ernst von Bibra
 Friedrich Wilhelm von Bismarck
 Gebhard Leberecht von Blücher
 Karl August Ferdinand von Borcke
 Gustav Jacob Born
 Władysław Grzegorz Branicki
 Adolf von Brudermann
 Rudolf von Brudermann
 Meno Burg
 Paul von Buri
 Ottavio Cagiano de Azevedo
 Yefim Chaplits
 Charles Frederick, Grand Duke of Baden
 Charles Louis, Hereditary Prince of Baden
 Christian of the Palatinate-Zweibrücken (1752–1817)
 Gustav Cohn
 John Edmund Commerell
 Carl Emanuel Conrad
 Dmitry Bagration-Imeretinsky
 Fleetwood Edwards
 Karl Friedrich Eichhorn
 Howard Craufurd Elphinstone
 Friedrich August Elsasser
 Grigori Engelhardt
 William Fane De Salis (admiral)
 Walther Forstmann
 Frederick William III, Duke of Schleswig-Holstein-Sonderburg-Beck
 Frederick Charles Louis, Duke of Schleswig-Holstein-Sonderburg-Beck
 Annibale de Gasparis
 Friedrich von Georgi
 Jean-Léon Gérôme
 Dmitry Golitsyn
 James Grierson
 Wilhelm Heinrich von Grolman
 Ian Hamilton (British Army officer)
 Carl Jacob Hammarsköld
 Eduard Heis
 William Hespeler
 Philip, Landgrave of Hesse-Homburg
 Paul von Hindenburg
 Dietrich Hogemann
 Heinrich Jacobi (archaeologist)
 John Jellicoe, 1st Earl Jellicoe
 Rudolf Jordan (painter)
 Archduke Joseph August of Austria
 Karl, Prince of Hohenzollern-Sigmaringen
 Thomas Kelly-Kenny
 Colin Richard Keppel
 Pyotr Kikin
 Franz Körte
 Semyon Kozak
 Prince Kraft zu Hohenlohe-Ingelfingen
 Ignacy Krasicki
 Charles Vane, 3rd Marquess of Londonderry
 Louis I, Grand Duke of Baden
 Gari Melchers
 Aleksey Melissino
 Edward Montagu-Stuart-Wortley
 Krzysztof Celestyn Mrongovius
 George Murray (British Army officer)
 Charles Napier (Royal Navy officer)
 Vladimir Nemirovich-Danchenko
 Daniel Nordlander
 Fabian Gottlieb von der Osten-Sacken
 Charles Sprague Pearce
 Karl von Plettenberg
 Kazimierz Porębski
 George Edward Post
 Dighton Probyn
 Antoni Radziwiłł
 Pablo Riccheri
 Julius Roeting
 Carl Ludwig Sahl
 John Francis Charles, 7th Count de Salis-Soglio
 Peter, 5th Count de Salis-Soglio
 Max Sandreczky
 Aleksei Scherbatov
 Ernst Christian Julius Schering
 Albert Schulz
 Manuel Silvela y Le Vielleuze
 Mikhail Skobelev
 Pavlo Skoropadskyi
 Thomas Smith-Dorrien-Smith
 Charles Spencer, 6th Earl Spencer
 Konstantin Stanislavski
 Wolfgang Straßmann
 Ludwig August von Stutterheim
 Wilhelm Ternite
 Otto Tschirch
 Diedrich Uhlhorn
 Antonio Aguilar y Correa, Marquis of Vega de Armijo
 Godfried van Voorst tot Voorst
 Baldwin Wake Walker
 Ricardo Wall
 Friedrich Wilhelm Weber
 Friedrich Wigger
 Wilhelm II, German Emperor
 Sir James Wylie, 1st Baronet
 Oskar von Xylander
 Aleksey Petrovich Yermolov
 Mass'oud Mirza Zell-e Soltan

What follows are some additional details on a fair cross section of individuals who were known to be conferred with the order in its several classes, in order of precedence. The Order of the Red Eagle was conferred frequently upon foreign nationals, both royal and non-royal, to honor their individual position or work and to further the diplomatic relations with their respective nations, in much the same way that the Order of the Bath is still conferred by the British monarchy.

Grand Cross (1861–1918)

German / Prussian

 Empress Augusta (1811–1890), wife and empress consort of Kaiser Wilhelm I
 GFM Albrecht Theodore Emil, Graf von Roon (1803–1879) – previous 3rd Class Knight, automatically awarded the Grand Cross in conjunction with being awarded with the Order of the Black Eagle, ca 1866, for service during the war with Austria, immediately after his success at the battle of Nikolsburg.
 Otto Theodor Freiherr von Manteuffel (1805–1882), Prussian Minister of the Interior (Prime Minister), 1848; awarded the Grand Cross, with Scepter and Crown, by Friedrich Wilhelm IV
 Prince Heinrich of Prussia, second son of Friedrich III and brother of Wilhelm II
 Empress Augusta Viktoria (1858–1921), wife and empress consort of Kaiser Wilhelm II
 Otto von Bismarck (1815–1898), German statesman, Prussian chancellor and prime minister of the German Empire
 Max von Fabeck (1854–1916), with oakleaves, Prussian General
 Gen-Lt. Ferdinand Graf von Zeppelin (1838–1917), aviator, inventor of the airship, and founder of Zeppelin Airship Company
 GFM (later Reichspräsident) Paul von Hindenburg (1847–1934), invested with the Grand Cross, with Oak Leaves and Swords
 Gustav von Senden-Bibran (1847–1909) with oak leaves and swords, was an admiral of the German Imperial Navy
 GFM Helmuth von Moltke (the Elder), (1800–1891), Chief of the German General Staff
 Crown Prince Wilhelm of Prussia, Crown Prince of the German Empire (1882–1951), invested c. his 10th birthday, 1892
 Prince Eitel Friedrich of Prussia (1883–1942), second son of Kaiser Wilhelm II
 Prince Adalbert of Prussia (1884–1948), third son of Kaiser Wilhelm II
 Prince August Wilhelm of Prussia (1887–1949), fourth son of Kaiser Wilhelm II
 Prince Oskar of Prussia (1888–1958), fifth son of Kaiser Wilhelm II
 Bernhard Freiherr von Bülow (1849–1929), Minister of Foreign Affairs, conferred, January 6, 1898, for his successes in advancing relations with China.
 Prince Joachim of Prussia (1890–1920), sixth son of Kaiser Wilhelm II
 Dr. Karl Heinrich Schönstedt, Prussian Minister of Justice, invested with the Grand Cross of the Order on the occasion of Kaiser Wilhelm II's birthday, January 27, 1900
 Ernst Frhr von Hammerstein-Loxten (1827–1914), Prussian Minister of Agriculture, conferred on the occasion of Kaiser Wilhelm II's birthday, January 27, 1900
 Arthur Count von Posadowsky-Wehner (1845–1932), Prussian Minister of the Interior and Vice Chancellor, conferred on the occasion of Kairser Wilhelm II´s birthday, January 27, 1902
 Prince Friedrich Sigismund of Prussia (1891–1927), nephew of Kaiser Wilhelm II, pilot during the Great War, invested with the Grand Cross with Crown
 Paul von Breitenbach (1850–1930), German Statesman; invested with the Grand Cross of the Order, 1913, by statute of the Order of the Black Eagle
 Großadmiral Alfred von Tirpitz (1849–1930); conferred with the Order of the Red Eagle, Grand Cross, with Crown; also conferred with the Order of the Black Eagle
 Korvettenkapitän Gerhard Stubenrauch (b. 1880) – previously awarded the Knight's Cross, 4th Class, Stubenrauch was the commander of all naval aviation in the Kaiserlich Marine

Foreign

 George IV, King of Great Britain (1762–1830), invested 6/9/1814
 William IV, King of Great Britain (1765–1837), invested 6/9/1814
 Charles Maurice de Talleyrand-Périgord, Prince Talleyrand (France)
 Prince Klemens Wenzel von Metternich, Prince Metternich-Winnebourg-Ochsenhausen (German: Klemens Wenzel Nepomuk Lothar Fürst von Metternich-Winneburg zu Beilstein), Austrian Foreign Minister, 1809–1848
  Prince Andreas Rasoumoffsky (1752–1836), PC (Russia)
 Gustavus, Count de Stackelberg, PC (Russia)
 Karl, Count of Nesselrode (1780–1862), Privy Councilor (Russia)
 Prince Alfred, Duke of Edinburgh & Saxe-Coburg_Gotha (1844–1900, GB), invested 5/7/1864
 Alexander III, Tsar of Russia (1845–1894)
 Gen Sir Dighton Probyn (1833–1924), VC, GCB – invested at GC / 1st Class (India / GB)
 Gen. Sir Thomas Kelly-Kenny (1840–1914), (GB)
 Edward VII, King of Great Britain (1841–1910), invested 1/17/1869
 Prince Arthur, Duke of Connaught and Strathearn (1850–1942, GB), invested 1873
 Prince Leopold, Duke of Albany (1853–1884, GB), invested 3/31/1879
 Prince Arthur of Connaught (1883–1938, GB), invested 1/13/1883
 Prince Kitashirakawa Yoshihisa (1847–1895), Japanese imperial family and soldier, invested December 1889
 Marquis Itō Hirobumi (1841–1909), Prime Minister of Japan, received the GC 12/22/1886, later received the GC in brilliants 12/14/1901
 Marquis Yamagata Aritomo (1838–1922), Prime Minister of Japan, invested June 1899
 Viscount Aoki Shūzō (1844–1914), Japanese minister to Berlin, received the GC 1/26/1895, later received the GC in brilliants 6/18/1897
 The Guangxu Emperor (1871–1908), 11th Qing Emperor of China, invested 1898
 First Class Marquis Suyi Li Hongzhang (1823-1901), Chinese politician and diplomat, invested 6/14/1896
 Yuan Shikai (1859–1916), Chinese politician and general
 Nikolay Karlovich Giers (1820–1895), Russian Foreign Minister and architect of the Franco-Russian Alliance; Grand Cross (by statute of the Order of the Black Eagle), July 23, 1888
 Prince Alfred of Edinburgh (1874–1899, GB), invested June 1889
 George V, King of Great Britain (1865–1936), invested 7/3/1890
 Alexander, Duke of Fife (1849–1912, GB), invested 1892
 Gen.-Lt. Constantin von Alvensleben (1809–1892), invested with the Grand Cross, 1892, by statute of the Order of the Black Eagle
 FM Archduke Friedrich of Austria-Hungary (1856–1936), GC / 1st Class (also held the Ord of the Black Eagle from October 22, 1892) – invested c. 1895
 Porfirio Díaz, President of Mexico (1876–1880, 1884–1911)
 St John Brodrick, British Secretary of State for War (1856–1942), invested in September 1902 when he visited Prussia for German Army maneuvers.
 Adolphus Cambridge, 1st Marquess of Cambridge (formerly Prince Adolphus Duke of Teck) (1868–1927, GB), invested 1903
 Count Katsura Tarō (1848–1913), Japanese politician and soldier, October 4, 1906
 Haakon VII, King of Norway (1872–1957), invested 5/27/1907
 Mahbub Ali Khan, Asaf Jah VI - Nizam (sovereign prince) of Hyderabad, a principality in India; honorary (British and Indian) lieutenant general, invested 1911
 Albert I, King of the Belgians (1875–1934)
 LTG Rt. Hon Charles William Stewart, Lord Stewart (GB) British soldier, politician and nobleman, great-grandfather of Winston Churchill
 MG Carl Löwenhielm, Count of Löwenhielm (Sweden / Norway)
 Franz Josef I, Emperor of Austria-Hungary (1830–1916)
 Ludwig IV, Grand Duke of Hesse & by Rhine (1837–1892), son-in-law of Queen Victoria; brother-in-law of Friedrich III; uncle of Wilhelm II
 Gen der INF Otto von Bülow – Nov 15, 1917, by statute regarding conferral of the Order of the Black Eagle 
 Ernst Ludwig, Grand Duke of Hesse and by Rhine (1868–1937), grandson of Queen Victoria, husband of Princess Victoria Melita of Edinburgh, cousin of Kaiser Wilhelm II, invested with the Grand Cross or the 1st Class (?)
 General der Infanterie Friedrich Bertram Sixt von Armin (1851–1936), awarded the Grand Cross by statute of the Order of the Black Eagle, conferred, 1917
 Prince Leopold of Bavaria (1846–1930); Awarded the Grand Cross with Swords; also a member of the Order of the Black Eagle
 Prince Franz of Bavaria (1875–1957); awarded the Grand Cross by statute of the Order of Black Eagle
 Naser al-Din Shah (1831–1896), Shah of Persia (1848–1896)
 Mozaffar al-Din Shah (1853–1907), Shah of Persia (1896–1907)
 Pavlo Skoropadskyi, hetman of the Ukrainian State. Granted in 1918
 Marcos Antônio de Araújo, Viscount of Itajubá. Ambassador of Emperor Dom Pedro II of Brazil to the King of Hanover and King of Prussia.

Knights 1st Class (1705–1918)

German
 Wilhelm Frhr von Humboldt (1767–1835) (Prussia), German language scholar and statesman
 Karl August, Prince of Hardenburg (1750–1822), Chancellor of State (Prussia), 1804–1806; 1807; and 1810–1822
 Ernst von Pfuel - Prussian general and Prime Minister of Prussia, awarded the 1st Class with Oak Leaves (1836) and Diamonds (1842). Previously awarded the 2nd Class with Oak Leaves (1830) and Star (1831); 3rd Class (1827)
 Ludwig von Massow, awarded the 1st Class with Oak Leaves
 Louis III, Grand Duke of Hesse (1806–1877), awarded the 1st Class with Swords
 Grand Admiral Alfred von Tirpitz, awarded the Order, 1st Class, with Oak Leaves, on the occasion of Kaiser Wilhelm II's birthday, January 27, 1900 (Source: New York Times)
 Dr. Studt, Minister of Public Instruction, awarded the Order, 1st Class, on the occasion of Kaiser Wilhelm II's birthday, January 27, 1900
 Count Hochberg, awarded the Order, 1st Class, on the occasion of Kaiser Wilhelm II's birthday, January 27, 1900
 Generalleutnant á la suite Viktor Adolph Theophil von Podbielski (1844–1916), hussar general, Prussian Minister of Agriculture, Postmaster General, and President of the German Olympic Committee; awarded 1st Class with oak leaves and crossed swords, on the occasion of Kaiser Wilhelm II´s birthday January 27, 1902
 Theodor von Holleben, German Ambassador to the United States; awarded 1st Class with oak leaves after the visit of Prince Henry of Prussia to the US, March 1902.
 Baron Hermann Speck von Sternburg, Prussian Consul to Calcutta, German Ambassador to the United States, awarded the 1st Class, Jan 5, 1903
 Anton von Werner (1871–1914), awarded the Order, 1st Class, 1912; previously awarded the 2nd Class
 GenObst Felix Graf von Bothmer of Bavaria (1852–1937), conferred with the Order, 1st Class, January 17, 1914
 Gen-Lt Philipp von Hellingrath of Bavaria (1862–1939), awarded the 1st Class with Swords, Nov 14, 1918; previously awarded the 2nd Class (7 Jun 1914)
 Henry William, Baron de Bülow awarded the Order 1st Class, Envoy Extraordinary & Minister Plenipotentiary to Her Majesty Queen Victoria
 Eduard von Jachmann, Prussian Vice Admiral, awarded 1st Class with Swords

Foreign

 Prince Talleyrand of France, Envoy of Emperor Napoleon I (Napoleon Bonaparte) of the French, to Russia, 1807; conferred with both the Order of the Black Eagle and the Red Eagle, before 1807
 Prince Alexander Borisovich Kourakin of Russia, Envoy of Tsar Alexander I of Russia, to France, 1807; conferred with both the Black Eagle Order and Red Eagle Order, before 1807
 Prince Leopold of Belgium (future Leopold II), Duke of Brabant, awarded the Order, 1st Class
 Count Maximilian van Lerchenfeld-Koefering, Chamberlain to the King of Bavaria, and envoy to the United States; conferred before 1845
 Giustino Fortunato (1777–1862), prime minister of the Kingdom of the Two Sicilies, conferred with the Red Eagle Order in 1850
 Lieutenant General Pierre-Dominique Bazaine (1786–1838) French mathematician and engineer
 Mehmed Emin Âli Pasha, Turkish Minister of Foreign Affairs, awarded the Order, 1st Class (for non-Christians), 1851
 Vicomte Vincent-Victor Henri de Vaublanc, Chamberlain to the King of Bavaria, October 21, 1856
 Kemal Effendi, Turkish Ambassador to Berlin, awarded the Order, 1st Class (for non-Christians), July 2, 1857
 Prince Mass'oud Mirza Zell-e Soltan (1850–1918), son of Naser al-Din Shah, King of Persia.
 President Paul Kruger (1825–1904), President of the Transvaal (first award in 1884, elevated to First Class in 1896)
 Marquis Saionji Kinmochi (1849–1940), Japanese minister to Berlin, October 15, 1891 
 Edward Villiers, 5th Earl of Clarendon (1846-1914), Lord-in-Waiting, in connection with the visit of Emperor Wilhelm II to the United Kingdom in late 1899.
 Lieutenant-General Sir Frederick Marshall, Colonel of the 1st Royal Dragoons, in connection with the visit of Emperor Wilhelm II to the United Kingdom in late 1899.
 Lieutenant-General Sir Thomas Kelly-Kenny (1840–1914), Adjutant-general of the British Forces, invested in September 1902 when he visited Prussia for German Army maneuvers.
 Lieutenant-General Sir John French (1852–1925), invested in September 1902 when he visited Prussia for German Army maneuvers.
 Baron Saitō Makoto (1858–1936), Japanese Navy Minister, February 26, 1907
 Liang Cheng (1864–1917), Chinese minister to Berlin, March 6, 1913

Knights 2nd Class (1810–1918)

German
 Mayer Carl Frhr von Rothschild (1820–1886), King's Court-Banker for Frankfurt, awarded the 2nd Class (for non-Christians), August 14, 1857
 Dr. Albert Sigismund Jaspis (1809–1885), Generalsuperintendant of Pommern in Stettin, awarded the 2nd Class, with Bow, by Kaiser Wilhelm I, 1/18/1863
 Anton von Werner (1871–1914), court painter to the Prussian royal family; awarded the Order 2nd Class, Jan 20, 1895, and awarded the breast star of the 2nd Class, Mar 30, 1902
 Johann Heinrich Frhr von Bernstorff (1862–1939), Ambassador to the United States, conferred with the Order, 2nd Class, on December 24, 1909
 Gen der INF Otto von Below (1857–1944), awarded the Order, 2nd Class, with oak leaves and with breast star, bef. 1914
 Gen. der INF Karl Rttr von Fasbender of Bavaria (1852–1933), conferred with the Order, 2nd Class, with Crown, and with breast star
 Gen der INF Paul Rttr von Kuenßl of Bavaria (1862–1928), awarded the 2nd Class with swords, 12 JUN 1915; previously awarded the 4th Class, pre-World War I
 Gen-Lt Nikolaus Rttr von Endres of Bavaria (1862–1938), awarded the 2nd Class with swords24 AUG 1917; previously awarded the 3rd Class with swords, pre-World War I
 Gen-Lt (later Gen der KAV) Alfred von Kühne (1853-1945); awarded the 2nd Class in 1912 when he first retired from the army.
 Gen der Kav Ludwig Freiherr von Gebsattel of Bavaria (1857–1930), awarded the 2nd Class with breast star; previously awarded the 3rd Class with Crown
 Gen-Lt (later Gen der KAV) Otto von Stetten of Bavaria (1862–1937); awarded the 2nd Class, prior to World War I
 Gen-Lt ( and later Gen der ARTy) Hermann frhr von Stein (1859–1928); awarded the 2nd Class with swords & the 2nd Class breast star with swords, 20 JAN 1917; previously awarded the 3rd Class, prior to World War I
 Gen-Maj ( later Gen-Lt) Ludwig Rttr von Tutschek of Bavaria (1864–1937); awarded the 2nd Class with Swords, 3 Feb 1917; previously awarded the 4th Class, prior to World War I
 Gen-Lt (later Gen der INF) Hermann von Kuhl (1858–1956); awarded the 2nd Class with Oak Leaves and swords, and the 2nd Class breast star, 15 JAN 1916 & 12 JAN 1918
 Gen-Lt Wilhelm Gröner of Württemberg (1867–1939), awarded the 2nd Class with Crown & Swords, and with breast star, 15 Jun 1918; previously awarded the 2nd Class w/o breast star (16 AUG 1917), 3rd Class (19 JUL 1913), 4th Class with Crown (17 Sep 1909); & 4th Class (11 SEP 1907)
 Gen-Lt Constantin Wilhelm Albert Müller, awarded the breast star of the Order, 2nd Class, with Oak leaves and Swords, by Kaiser Wilhelm II, 10/23/1918; Previously awarded the 3rd Class with Crown and Swords
 Vice ADM Franz von Hipper (?), German hero of the Battle of the Jutland; awarded the Order, 2nd Class; previously awarded the 3rd Class with Bow and 4th Class with Crown
 Vizeadmiral (Vice Admiral) and Admiral à la suite (honorary [full] Admiral) Bernhard Otto Curt von Prittwitz und Gaffron (1849–1922); veteran of the Austro-Prussian War and Franco-Prussian War, closely linked with Großadmiral (Grand Admiral) Prince Heinrich of Prussia, his frequent predecessor in various naval command stations.
 Baron Guenther Heinrich von Berg (1765–1843) Statesman, Doctor of Law, Judge, Legislator. Invested 28 June 1820.
 Bernard Hebeler (1794-1862) Prussian Consul-General awarded the Order 2nd Class, by Frederick William IV of Prussia, 1842

Foreign
 Mustafa-ed-din Bey, Turkish First Dragoman, awarded the 2nd Class (for non-Christians), September 14, 1855
 Mohammed Essad Safvet-Effendi, Turkish Undersecretary of State in the Ministry of Foreign Affairs, awarded the 2nd Class (for non-Christians), September 14, 1855
 Admiral of the Fleet Sir John Jellicoe, 1st Earl Jellicoe of Great Britain (1859–1935), awarded the Order, 2nd Class, with swords, for actions in China during the Boxer Rebellion, where he served as a captain.
 Captain Edward Henry Bayly, Royal Navy, Captain of HMS Aurora, awarded the Order, 2nd class, with swords, for services in China during the Boxer Rebellion.
 Charles Thomas Jackson, American physician and scientist who was active in medicine, chemistry, mineralogy, and geology.
 Frederick J.V. Skiff, Field Museum of Chicago, Paris Exhibition (1900) organizer, and Director of Exhibits, St. Louis Exhibition (1906), awarded 2nd Class, Jan 12, 1906, for work with the St. Louis World's Fair
 J.P. Morgan (1837–1913), American Banker, honored after giving an original letter from Martin Luther to Emperor Charles V back to Germany, June 26, 1911
 Nicholas Murray Butler, President of Columbia University, for building the exchange program between American and German professors, and winner of the 1931 Nobel Peace Prize
 Professor Hugo Münsterberg, Harvard Exchange Professor at Berlin, awarded the Order, 2nd Class, August 23, 1911
 James Speyer, American banker and president of the banking house Speyer & Company, awarded the 2nd Class, Jan 20, 1912
 His Princely Highness Pakubuwono X (1866–1939), the 10th Susuhunan, ruler of the past Surakarta (now in present Surakarta, Indonesia), awarded the Order, 2nd Class, with Star.
 Wilhelm Freiherr Lenk von Wolfsberg (1809–1894), Austrian Feldzeugmeister, owner of the Corps Artillery Regiment No. 4 and scientist, awarded the 2nd Class in 1861
 Maj-Gen the Hon Edward James Montagu-Stuart-Wortley CB, CMG, DSO, MVO (1857–1934) of Great Britain's King's Royal Rifle Corps.
 Dudley Marjoribanks, 3rd Baron Tweedmouth (1874–1935), invested in September 1902 when he visited Prussia for German Army maneuvers.

Knights 3rd Class (1810–1918)

 Jan Willem Louis van Oordt (1808-1884), awarded the Knights Cross, 3rd Class, for services to the Imperial Navy, 1850
 Major (later Field Marshal) Albrecht von Roon (1803–1879) – awarded the Knights Cross, 3rd Class for actions and service during the Baden insurrection, 1848
 Oberst (Colonel) Louis Lust, commander of the Captain-Cadet School, awarded the Knight's Cross, 3rd Class, with Bow, by Kaiser Wilhelm I, 12/19/1878
 Captain Hans-Wilhelm von Dresky (later Rear Admiral) – awarded the Knight's Cross, 3rd Class, with swords and ribbon, for actions while in command of the cruiser SMS Habicht.
 Hermann von Wissmann, awarded the 3rd Class with Crown and Swords, September 3, 1894
 Oberst Friedrich von Scholl, awarded the 3rd Class with Crown and Swords, 1895
 Oberst Pavel, awarded the 3rd Class with Crown and Swords for actions in Cameroon, 1902
 Hauptmann (army Captain) Franke, awarded the 3rd Class with Crown and Swords, for actions in South West Africa (Namibia), 1904
 Käptain zur Sea (naval Captain) Pohl, awarded the 3rd Class with Crown and Swords for actions in East Asia, 1905

 Oberst (future Generalleutnant) Constantin Wilhelm Albert von Müller, awarded the 3rd Class with Crown and Swords for actions in Cameroon, 1905
 John Schroers, Chairman of Education and the Educational Congresses, and later Director of the St. Louis World's Fair, 1904–1906; awarded the 3rd Class, Feb 23, 1905, for work with the St. Louis World's Fair
 Oberstleutnant von Estorff, awarded the 3rd Class with Crown and Swords for actions in South West Africa, 1905
 Howard J. Rogers, Chief of the Department of Education & Social Economics, involved with St. Louis Exhibition (1906); awarded the 3rd Class, Jan. 12, 1906, for work with the St. Louis World's Fair
 Oberst Constantin von Falkenhayn, commander of 5. Badisches Infantry-Regiment Nr 113, awarded the 3rd Class, with Bow, June 1913
 Georg, Crown Prince of Greece (Later King George II of Greece), awarded the 3rd Class with Crown and Swords, 1913
 Gen der Art. Konrad Krafft von Dellmensingen of Bavaria (1862–1953); Received the Order, 3rd Class, before World War I
 Gen der Kav Ludwig Freiherr von Gebsattel, awarded the 3rd Class with Crown; later awarded the 2nd Class with breast star
 Oberst (later Gen-Maj) Hans Rttr von Hemmer of Bavaria (1869–1931); awarded 3rd Class with swords, 15 MAY 1915; previously awarded the 4th Class, pre-World War I
 R-Adm Franz von Hipper; awarded the 3rd Class with Crown, date unknown
 Oberst (Colonel) Richard Franz Joseph Haegele, awarded the 3rd Class, with Bow and Swords (two times black, three white striped ribbon), 12/14/1916
 Oberst Scmidt, awarded the 3rd Class, with Bow and Swords (2 x black, 3 x white), 12/22/1917
 Rittmeister (cavalry Captain) Manfred Albrecht Frhr von Richthofen (1892–1918) also known as "The Red Baron", awarded the 3rd Class, with Crown & Swords, for earning an unprecedented 70th aerial victory as Germany's top fighter ace of the Great War, April 6, 1918. This was one of only two such awards during the Great War for someone of company grade rank.
 Oberst Klehmet, awarded the 3rd Class, with Bow and Swords (2 x black, 3 x white), 5/25/1918
 Oberstleutnant Maercker, awarded the 3rd Class with Crown and Swords for actions during the Great War, November 16, 1918
 Mathew Kiely, Chief of Police St. Louis, Missouri (1901–1906), received the Order 3rd Class for his department's commendable performance during the 1902 visit of Prince Henry
 Lt.Col. E. H. Swayne, Somerset Light Infantry without swords
Lt.Col. George Limbrey Sclater-Booth, 2nd Baron Basing, 1st The Royal Dragoons without swords

Knights 4th Class (1830–1918)

 Maj. E.D.Bally, Somerset Light Infantry
 Sevki Bey, District Governor of Aclun (Northern Syria, Ottoman Empire), awarded the 4th Class
 Dr. Ernst Freiherr von Bibra 1854 (1806 – 1878) was a German Naturalist (Natural history scientist) and author. Ernst was a botanist, zoologist, metallurgist, chemist, geographer, travel writer, novelist, duellist, art collector and trailblazer in ethnopsychopharmacology.
 Hauptmann Curt von Brandenstein, 1879-1964, Pour le Me'rite 26.9.1918, HOH w/ Swords, Hessian Bravery medal, Leibregiment Grossherzogin (3. Grossherzoglich Hessisches) Nr.117
 Captain von Dresky (later Rear Admiral) – awarded the 4th Class, with swords, for actions at Miang while in command of the cruiser SMS Habicht
 Hauptmann (Captain) Constantin von Falkenhayn, awarded the 4th Class, for service in the Füsilier-Regiment Fürst Karl-Anton von Hohenzollern (Hohenzollernsches) Nr 40, January 1900
 Rittmeister Richard Franz Joseph Haegele, awarded the 4th Class, 10/21/1901, for service as commander of the East Asian Field Bakery in the Prussian Army; Later awarded the 4th Class with Swords, for actions in South West Africa (modern day Namibia)
 Heinrich Johannes Halke, awarded the 4th Class, 1/18/1886
 Rittmeister (later Generalmajor) Arthur Hay, prior-enlisted cavalry officer, May 12, 1901
 General Wilhelm Heye, awarded the 4th Class with swords
 Leutnant Paul von Hindenburg (later GFM & Reichspräsident) – awarded the 4th Class, with swords, after actions against the Austrians at Königrätz, July 3, 1866
 Charles John Hexamer (1862-1921), co-founded and first president of the National German-American Alliance, awarded in 1904
 Tarleton Hoffman Bean (1846–1916), first Curator of Fishes at the Smithsonian Institution; Director of the Forestry and Fisheries exhibit at the Paris Exhibition, 1900; Chief of the Departments of Fish, Game and Forestry, St. Louis World's Fair, 1902–05; awarded the 4th Class, Jan 12, 1906, for work with the St. Louis World's Fair
 First Lieutenant Carl Hermann Arthur Finster (1865-1929), Author and Diplomat, 1908
 Joseph Austin Holmes (1859–1915), geologist, and first director of the Bureau of Mines, credited with advances in mine safety, and for the slogan "Safety First"; Chief of Mines and Metallurgy at the St. Louis World's Fair, 1904–1906; awarded the 4th Class, Jan 12, 1906, for work with the St. Louis World's Fair
 F.D. Hirschberg, Chairman of Reception and Entertainment, St Louis World's Fair, 1904–1906; awarded the 4th Class, Jan 12, 1906, for work with the St. Louis World's Fair
 Prof. Otto Jaekel (1863-1929), geologist and paleontologist, awarded April 3, 1913
 Obst-Lt (later Gen der Artillerie) Friedrich Frhr. Kreß von Kressenstein of Bavaria (1870–1948); awarded the 4th Class prior to World War I
 John H. McGibbons, Secretary of Awards for Division of Exhibitions, St. Louis World's Fair, 1904–1906; awarded the 4th Class, Jan 12, 1906, for work with the St. Louis World's Fair
 Lt.Col. Hon. George Henry Morris, Irish Guards
 Dr. Ludwig Karl Georg Pfeiffer, botanist and conchologist, 1875
 Premierleutnant (First Lieutenant) Ernst von Prittwitz und Gaffron, awarded the 4th Class in 1864
 Carl Friedrich Rohte, awarded the 4th Class, 8/22/1907, for service to the Crown
 Hermann Aleksander Eduard von Salza, Russian Navy, 1910
 Ernst Friederich Ludwig Scheyder, Amtsrat, presented with Red Eagle August 10, 1911, for dedicated service to the crown
 Frederick Winslow Taylor (1856–1915), mechanical engineer; President of the American Society of mechanical Engineers, who is credited for innovations in management principles; awarded the 4th Class, Jan. 12, 1906, for work with St. Louis World's Fair
 Adolf Werner (Artillery Officer), awarded the 4th Class, 1904
 Lt.Col. L.E.C.Worthington-Wilmer, Somerset Light Infantry

Medal for Enlisted Men

 Musicmeister Jacob Peuppus, 2. Infanterie-Regiments Kronprinz; awarded November 16, 1900
 Feldwebel August Keller, 2. Infanterie-Regiments Kronprinz; awarded November 16, 1900
 Sergenten Maximilian Büchert, 2. Infanterie-Regiments Kronprinz; awarded November 16, 1900
 Wachtmeister Otto Grieszing, 1. Schwerin Reiter-Regiment Prinz Karl von Bayern; awarded November 16, 1900
 Matthias Kürmeher, 4. Infanterie-Regiments, König Wilhelm von Württemberg; awarded June 15, 1903
 Karl Lemnitz, 2. Fuß-Artillerie-Regiments, Königliche von Preußen; awarded June 15, 1903
 Fortunatus Klun, Hof-Saal-Kammerdiener, Saaldienst, Obersthofmeister Staab, Austria Hungary; awarded 1903
 Adolf Zimmerman, Hof-Saal-Türhüter, Saaldienst, Obersthofmeister Staab, Austria Hungary; awarded 1903
 Thomas Drozda, Hof-Saal-Türhüter, Saaldienst, Obersthofmeister Staab, Austria Hungary; awarded 1903
 Franz Fahnier, Hof-Saal-Türhüter, Saaldienst, Obersthofmeister Staab, Austria Hungary; awarded 1903
 Josef Kramlinger, Hof-Saal-Türhüter, Saaldienst, Obersthofmeister Staab, Austria Hungary; awarded 1903
 Josef Blaha, Hof-Saal-Türhüter, Saaldienst, Obersthofmeister Staab, Austria Hungary; awarded 1903
 Georg Schögl, Hof-Saal-Türhüter, Saaldienst, Obersthofmeister Staab, Austria Hungary; awarded 1903

Sources
 Atlantic Daily News, October 31, 1906. New York: Hamburg-American Line. Available on the Internet: https://earlyradiohistory.us/1906hamb.htm
 Danner, David. Recipients of the Military Max Josef Order in World War I. available on the Internet: https://web.archive.org/web/20090524233821/http://home.att.net/~ordersandmedals/MMJO/MMJO1-2.htm
 Der Rittmeister Militaria, LLC. Internet: https://web.archive.org/web/20080105133048/http://www.derrittmeister.com/home.htm
 Encyclopædia Britannica. 11th Ed. New York: Encyclopædia Britannica Company, 1911
 Encyclopedia Americana. New York: The Encyclopedia American Corporation, 1918. p. 673
 Haandbuch des Allerhöchsten Hofes und des Hofstaates Seiner K. und K. Apostoliscen Majistät, fur 1906. Vienna: Empire of Austria-Hungary, 1903
 Handbuch über den Königlich Preußischen Hof und Staat für das Jahr 1918. (1918 Prussian State Handbook) Berlin, 1918.
 Index of Royal Colonels of Commonwealth Land Forces. Available on the Internet: https://web.archive.org/web/20080202130333/http://regiments.org/biography/royals/colchief.htm
 Journal of the Medals and Orders Society of America, Vol 52, No. 3, pp. 16 – 17. On the Internet: http://www.medalnet.net/Red_Eagle_Order_Haegele.htm
 Marquis, Albert Nelson. Who's Who in New England. 2nd Ed. Chicago: A.N. Marquis & Co., 1916
 New York Times Archives. New York: New York Times. January 8, 1898; January 28, 1900; December 25, 1909; August 24, 1911. Available on the Internet: https://query.nytimes.com/search/query?frow=0&n=10&srcht=s&daterange=period&query=Red+Eagle+Order&srchst=p&hdlquery=&bylquery=&mon1=09&day1=18&year1=1851&mon2=12&day2=31&year2=1980&submit.x=0&submit.y=0
 Schulze Ising, Andreas M. Imperial German Orders, Medals, and Decorations. Martinsville, Virginia: Available on the Internet: http://www.medalnet.net/Red_Eagle_Order_3rd_crown_swords.htm
 Treaty between France and Russia, Tilsit, July 7, 1807.
 Verordnungsblatt des Königlich bayerischen Kriegsministeriums, Munich: Kingdom of Bavaria, 1900
 Verordnungsblatt des Königlich bayerischen Kriegsministeriums, Munich: Kingdom of Bavaria, 1903

References 

Red Eagle
Red Eagle
Kingdom of Prussia
Awards established in 1792
1792 establishments in Prussia